KBS2 or variants may refer to:

 KBS 2TV (KBS 2TV), a Korean TV station
 KBS Radio 2 (KBS Happy FM), a Korean radio station
 KBS 2FM, the former name of Korean radio station KBS Cool FM

See also
 KBS (disambiguation)
 KBSS